The Kentucky Bend, variously called the New Madrid Bend, Madrid Bend, Bessie Bend, or Bubbleland,  is an exclave of Fulton County, Kentucky, encircled by the states of Tennessee and Missouri. It is a portion of a peninsula defined by an oxbow loop meander of the Mississippi River, and its inclusion in the state of Kentucky stems from uncertainties of the course of the Mississippi River when the boundary between Tennessee and Kentucky was established.

Kentucky Bend is the extreme southwestern corner of Kentucky. The peninsula is traversed by the southern line of latitude of the state of Kentucky, at the banks of the Mississippi River. The only highway into the area is Tennessee State Route 22, whose continuation into Kentucky Bend at one time was signed as Kentucky State Route 313.

As of the 2020 census, the population was 9 persons in this area, tabulated as the Kentucky Bend Census County Division. The mailing address of the area is Tiptonville, Tennessee. New Madrid, Missouri, is directly across the river to the north, but it is not connected to the bend by road or ferry. The closest crossings of the Mississippi River are the Dorena–Hickman Ferry and the Caruthersville Bridge located in nearby Dyer County.

Geography
The water area is primarily within the Mississippi River. Surveyors marking the boundary between Kentucky and Tennessee had only estimated where their line would meet the Mississippi; later, more detailed surveys revealed the location of this line to pass through north-south bends in the river, creating a division of the peninsula. The western border of Kentucky is designated as the Mississippi River, as is the eastern border of Missouri—thus the creation of a "notch" for Kentucky, but not for Tennessee.

History

The border predates the separation of Kentucky from Virginia and Tennessee from North Carolina. Its location stems from the Royal Colonial Boundary of 1665, which was meant to delimit overlapping inland claims of the Colony of Virginia and the Province of Carolina, respectively.

In 1812, this area of the river was highly disrupted and was reported to even flow backward because of the 1811–1812 New Madrid series of earthquakes, some of the most powerful ever felt in the United States.

The state of Tennessee contested the inclusion of the Kentucky Bend in the state of Kentucky, claiming it as part of Obion County until at least 1848, but Tennessee eventually dropped its claim.

This area of the Mississippi River, from just east at "Island Number Ten" around to the town of New Madrid, Missouri, was the site of a Civil War battle from February 28 to April 8, 1862, the Battle of Island Number Ten.

Due to its highly productive soil in the river's floodplain, Kentucky Bend was developed as a major cotton-producing area. The 1870 census recorded more than 300 residents. In The West Tennessee Farm edited by Marvin Downing (University of Tennessee at Martin Press, 1979), Norman L. Parks reports  a population in 1880 of 303, of whom 18 were African American. By 1900,  "large numbers of Negroes in the Bend" were working as laborers to plant and harvest the cotton.

In Mark Twain's book Life on the Mississippi, he described the six-decade-long feud between the Darnell and Watson families and other elements of life in the bend.

Demographics

Climate
The Kentucky Bend, like the nearby Missouri Bootheel and Western Tennessee, has a humid subtropical climate (Köppen Cfa) with characteristics of a humid continental climate, and experiences hot, humid summers and chilly, though not severe, winters. Winter weather can vary from very mild and wet when air masses from the Gulf of Mexico predominate, to very cold, dry, and windy with northerly or northwesterly airflows as in the famous cold month of January 1977.

Rainfall is fairly heavy throughout the year due to moist air from the Gulf of Mexico being advected on the western side of the Bermuda High, plus occasional remnant depressions from hurricanes passing up the Mississippi Valley.

Snowfall is common during the winter, with around  annually.

See also
 Carter Lake, Iowa

References

External links
Video about Kentucky's Mississippi border (synopsis)
Article on life in the Kentucky Bend
Article on Kentucky Bend and source of its nickname "Bubbleland"
 Bowed Radio at the New Madrid Bend
 Google Maps link (satellite view)

Border irregularities of the United States
Geography of Fulton County, Kentucky
Geography of Kentucky
Mississippi River
Geography of Obion County, Tennessee
Unincorporated communities in Kentucky
Borders of Kentucky
Unincorporated communities in Fulton County, Kentucky
Exclaves in the United States